Karl Michael von Levetzow (10 April 1871, Dobromilice – 4 October 1945, Mírov) was a Moravian German poet and librettist.

Librettos
 Ruth. Ein Hirtenlied in 5 Bildern in Neuversen. Divak, Mähren 1919
 Scirocco. Oper in 3 Akten . Eugen d'Albert 1919, premiered 1921 Darmstadt
 Der goldene Pfad. Eine Botschaft der Liebe und Selbstentäußerung  Wiener Literarische Anstalt, Vienna 1921
 Die schwarze Orchidee. Oper in 3 Akten. Musik: Eugen d'Albert premiered 1928 Leipzig
 Mister Wu. Oper in 3 Akten. Eugen d'Albert Leo Blech. premiered  1932 Dresden
 Der goldene Schlüssel. Singspiel  in 3 Akten. for Hannes Sieber, Heyer, Berlin 1933
 Enoch Arden, Ottmar Gerster 1936

References

German poets
German librettists
1871 births
1945 deaths
People from Prostějov District